Kerry E. White (born 1954) is an American politician who served as a member of the Montana House of Representatives for the 64th district from 2013 to 2021. He is a member of the Republican party.

References

Living people
1954 births
Republican Party members of the Montana House of Representatives
21st-century American politicians